Steven L. Pawk (August 14, 1914 – March 4, 2009) was an American professional basketball player. He played for the Warren Penns in the National Basketball League and averaged 3.5 points per game. His older brother was Johnny Pawk, who also played professional basketball.

He was the uncle of Tony Award-winning singer and actress Michele Pawk.

References

1914 births
2009 deaths
American men's basketball players
Basketball players from Pennsylvania
Centers (basketball)
Forwards (basketball)
People from Butler, Pennsylvania
Warren Penns players